Bajo sospecha is a Spanish crime drama television series produced by Bambú Producciones for Atresmedia. It airs on Atresmedia's main channel Antena 3. The first season was initially planned to have 10 episodes, but about 20% of the filmed scenes were edited out to reduce the number to 8. The first season revolved around an investigation by undercover police officers Víctor Reyes (Yon González) and Laura Cortés (Blanca Romero), alongside their superior, Superintendent Casas (Lluís Homar). In May 2015, it was confirmed that the series would have a second season, centered on a different investigation, in which Yon González and Lluís Homar would reprise their roles, with Olivia Molina playing the new main female character.

Plot

Season one
In the small town of Cienfuegos, it's a very special day for 7-year-old Alicia Vega (Aroa Palacios) and her family: her First Communion. However, when they are celebrating at the family's restaurant, closed for the occasion, she goes missing.

After two weeks of search, the police only knows one thing: the culprit is one of the people invited to the ceremony. Undercover agents Víctor and Laura arrive in Cienfuegos pretending to be a married couple to infiltrate the surroundings of the Vega family and the rest of suspects.

Season two
The Montalbán Polyclinic Hospital lies just outside Madrid. At the hospital, the strange disappearance of a young French resident is followed by the murder of the chief nurse. Víctor will have to go undercover on the hospital without much evidence to solve the crimes. Only the surveillance video record where the kidnapping of one of the women can be seen. What Víctor, Casas and Vidal (Vicente Romero) do know is that the culprit is an employee of the hospital, and because of it the best way to know is going undercover.

The fact that the disappeared girl is a French citizen will cause the arrival of a French Police inspector and an agent (Mar Sodupe and Hugo Becker) who will go undercover along with Víctor in a complicated police collaboration: frictions are frequent due to the different procedures and ways of seeing the investigation.

Episodes

Season 1

Season 2

References

2010s Spanish drama television series
2015 Spanish television series debuts
2016 Spanish television series endings
Antena 3 (Spanish TV channel) network series
Spanish crime television series
Television series by Bambú Producciones